Donji Gradac may refer to:
 Donji Gradac, Konjic, a village in Konjic, Bosnia and Herzegovina
 Donji Gradac, Široki Brijeg, a village in Široki Brijeg, Bosnia and Herzegovina